The history of science and technology (HST) is a field of history that examines the understanding of the natural world (science) and the ability to manipulate it (technology) at different points in time. This academic discipline also studies the cultural, economic, and political impacts of and contexts for scientific practices.

Academic study of history of science

History of science is an academic discipline with an international community of specialists. Main professional organizations for this field include the History of Science Society, the British Society for the History of Science, and the European Society for the History of Science.

Much of the study of the history of science has been devoted to answering questions about what science is, how it functions, and whether it exhibits large-scale patterns and trends.

History of the academic study of history of science 
Histories of science were originally written by practicing and retired scientists, starting primarily with William Whewell's History of the Inductive Sciences (1837), as a way to communicate the virtues of science to the public.

Auguste Comte proposed that there should be a specific discipline to deal with the history of science.

The development of the distinct academic discipline of the history of science and technology did not occur until the early 20th century. Historians have suggested that this was bound to the changing role of science during the same time period.

After World War I, extensive resources were put into teaching and researching the discipline, with the hopes that it would help the public better understand both Science and Technology as they came to play an exceedingly prominent role in the world.

In the decades since the end of World War II, history of science became an academic discipline, with graduate schools, research institutes, public and private patronage, peer-reviewed journals, and professional societies.

Formation of academic departments 
In the United States, a more formal study of the history of science as an independent discipline was initiated by George Sarton's publications, Introduction to the History of Science (1927) and the journal Isis (founded in 1912). Sarton exemplified the early 20th-century view of the history of science as the history of great men and great ideas. He shared with many of his contemporaries a Whiggish belief in history as a record of the advances and delays in the march of progress.

The study of the history of science continued to be a small effort until the rise of Big Science after World War II. With the work of I. Bernard Cohen at Harvard, the history of science began to become an established subdiscipline of history in the United States.

In the United States, the influential bureaucrat Vannevar Bush, and the president of Harvard, James Conant, both encouraged the study of the history of science as a way of improving general knowledge about how science worked, and why it was essential to maintain a large scientific workforce.

Universities with history of science and technology programs

Argentina 
 Buenos Aires Institute of Technology, Argentina, has been offering courses on History of the Technology and the Science.
 National Technological University, Argentina, has a complete history program on its offered careers.

Australia 
 The University of Sydney offers both undergraduate and postgraduate programmes in the History and Philosophy of Science, run by the Unit for the History and Philosophy of Science, within the Science Faculty. Undergraduate coursework can be completed as part of either a Bachelor of Science or a Bachelor of Arts Degree.  Undergraduate study can be furthered by completing an additional Honours year. For postgraduate study, the Unit offers both coursework and research-based degrees. The two course-work based postgraduate degrees are the Graduate Certificate in Science (HPS) and the Graduate Diploma in Science (HPS). The two research based postgraduate degrees are a Master of Science (MSc) and Doctor of Philosophy (PhD).

Belgium 
 University of Liège, has a Department called Centre d'histoire des Sciences et Techniques.

Canada 
 Carleton University Ottawa offer courses in Ancient Science and Technology in its Technology, Society and Environment program.
 University of Toronto has a program in History and Philosophy of Science and Technology.
 Huron University College offers a course in the History of Science which follows the development and philosophy of science from 10,000 BCE to the modern day. 
 University of King's College in Halifax, Nova Scotia has a History of Science and Technology Program.

France 
 Nantes University has a dedicated Department called Centre François Viète.
 Paris Diderot University (Paris 7) has a Department of History and Philosophy of Science.
 A CNRS research center in History and Philosophy of Science SPHERE, affiliated with Paris Diderot University, has a dedicated history of technology section.
 Pantheon-Sorbonne University (Paris 1)  has a dedicated Institute of History and Philosophy of Science and Technics.
 The École Normale Supérieure de Paris has a history of science Department.

Germany 
 Technische Universität Berlin, has a program in the History of Science and Technology.

Greece 
 The University of Athens has a Department of Philosophy and History of Science

India 
History of science and technology is a well-developed field in India. At least three generations of scholars can be identified.
The first generation includes D.D.Kosambi, Dharmpal, Debiprasad Chattopadhyay and Rahman. The second generation mainly consists of Ashis Nandy, Deepak Kumar, Dhruv Raina, S. Irfan Habib, Shiv Visvanathan, Gyan Prakash, Stan Lourdswamy, V.V. Krishna, Itty Abraham, Richard Grove, Kavita Philip, Mira Nanda and Rob Anderson. There is an emergent third generation that includes scholars like Abha Sur and Jahnavi Phalkey.

Departments and Programmes

The National Institute of Science, Technology and Development Studies had a research group active in the 1990s which consolidated social history of science as a field of research in India. 
Currently there are several institutes and university departments offering HST programmes.
Jawaharlal Nehru University has an Mphil-PhD program that offer specialisation in Social History of Science. It is at the History of Science and Education group of the Zakir Husain Centre for Educational Studies (ZHCES) in the School of Social Sciences. Renowned Indian science historians Deepak Kumar and Dhruv Raina teach here. Also, *Centre for Studies in Science Policy has an Mphil-PhD program that offers specialization in Science, Technology, and Society along with various allied subdisciplines.
Central University of Gujarat has an MPhil-PhD programme in Studies in Science, Technology & Innovation Policy at the Centre for Studies in Science, Technology & Innovation Policy (CSSTIP), where Social History of Science and Technology in India is a major emphasis for research and teaching.
 Banaras Hindu University has programs: one in History of Science and Technology at the Faculty of Science and one in Historical and Comparative Studies of the Sciences and the Humanities at the Faculty of Humanities.
 Andhra University has now set History of Science and Technology as a compulsory subject for all the First year B-Tech students.

Israel 
Tel Aviv University. The Cohn Institute for the History and Philosophy of Science and Ideas is a research and graduate teaching institute within the framework of the School of History of Tel Aviv University.
Bar-Ilan University has a graduate program in Science, Technology, and Society.

Japan 
Kyoto University has a program in the Philosophy and History of Science.
Tokyo Institute of Technology has a program in the History, Philosophy, and Social Studies of Science and Technology.
The University of Tokyo has a program in the History and Philosophy of Science.

Netherlands 
 Utrecht University, has two co-operating programs: one in History and Philosophy of Science at the Faculty of Natural Sciences and one in Historical and Comparative Studies of the Sciences and the Humanities at the Faculty of Humanities.

Poland 

 Institute for the History of Science of the Polish Academy of Sciences offers PhD programmes and habilitation degrees in the fields of History of Science, Technology and Ideas.

Russia

Spain 
University of the Basque Country, offers a master's degree and PhD programme in History and Philosophy of Science and runs since 1952 THEORIA. International Journal for Theory, History and Foundations of Science. The university also sponsors the Basque Museum of the History of Medicine and Science, the only open museum of History of Science of Spain, that in the past offered also PhD courses.
 Universitat Autònoma de Barcelona, offers a master's degree and PhD programme in HST together with the Universitat de Barcelona.
 Universitat de València, offers a master's degree and PhD programme in HST together with the Consejo Superior de Investigaciones Científicas.

Sweden 
 Linköpings universitet, has a Science, Technology, and Society program which includes HST.

Switzerland 
 University of Bern, has an undergraduate and a graduate program in the History and Philosophy of Science.

Ukraine

 State University of Infrastructure and Technologies, has a Department of Philosophy and History of Science and technology.

United Kingdom 
 University of Bristol has a masters and PhD program in the Philosophy and History of Science.
 University of Cambridge has an undergraduate course and a large masters and PhD program in the History and Philosophy of Science (including the History of Medicine).
 University of Durham has several undergraduate History of Science modules in the Philosophy department, as well as Masters and PhD programs in the discipline.
 University of Kent has a Centre for the History of the Sciences, which offers Masters programmes and undergraduate modules.
 University College London's Department of Science and Technology Studies offers undergraduate programme in History and Philosophy of Science, including two BSc single honour degrees (UCAS V550 and UCAS L391), plus both major and minor streams in history, philosophy and social studies of science in UCL's Natural Sciences programme. The department also offers MSc degrees in History and Philosophy of Science and in the study of contemporary Science, Technology, and Society. An MPhil/PhD research degree is offered, too. UCL also contains a Centre for the History of Medicine. This operates a small teaching programme in History of Medicine.
 University of Leeds has both undergraduate and graduate programmes in History and Philosophy of Science in the Department of Philosophy.
University of Manchester offers undergraduate modules and postgraduate study in History of Science, Technology and Medicine and is sponsored by the Wellcome Trust.
University of Oxford has a one-year graduate course in 'History of Science: Instruments, Museums, Science, Technology' associated with the Museum of the History of Science.
 The London Centre for the History of Science, Medicine, and Technology - this Centre closed in 2013. It was formed in 1987 and ran a taught MSc programme, jointly taught by University College London's Department of Science and Technology Studies and Imperial College London. The Masters programme transferred to UCL.

United States 
Academic study of the history of science as an independent discipline was launched by George Sarton at Harvard with his book Introduction to the History of Science (1927) and the Isis journal (founded in 1912).  Sarton exemplified the early 20th century view of the history of science as the history of great men and great ideas. He shared with many of his contemporaries a Whiggish belief in history as a record of the advances and delays in the march of progress. The History of Science was not a recognized subfield of American history in this period, and most of the work was carried out by interested Scientists and Physicians rather than professional Historians.  With the work of I. Bernard Cohen at Harvard, the history of Science became an established subdiscipline of history after 1945.

 Arizona State University's Center for Biology and Society offers several paths for MS or PhD students who are interested in issues surrounding the history and philosophy of the science, particularly biological sciences.  The strength of the center has much to do with the success of its director Jane Maienschein.  With a concentration in Biology and Society one can focus on History and Philosophy of Science, Bioscience Ethics, Policy and Law, or Ecology, Economics, and Ethics of the Environment.
 Brown University has a program in Science and Technology Studies and the History of Mathematics. (This program is in the process of being phased out.  There are no longer any full-time faculty, and no new students are being admitted to the program.)
 California Institute of Technology offers courses in the History and Philosophy of Science to fulfill its core humanities requirements.
 Case Western Reserve University has an undergraduate interdisciplinary program in the History and Philosophy of Science and a graduate program in the History of Science, Technology, Environment, and Medicine (STEM).
 Cornell University offers a variety of courses within the Science and Technology course. One notable course is called Science and Technology History, taught currently by Professor Peter Dear, which centers upon the development of Science and Technology History from the Newtonian era up to the Einsteinian revolution. This class is one of the longest running classes at Cornell University and is offered by the College of Arts and Sciences and caters to students who want to learn more about the development of modern science.
 Georgia Institute of Technology has an undergraduate and graduate program in the History of Technology and Society.
 Harvard has a large undergraduate and graduate program in History of Science, and is one of the largest departments currently in the world.
 Indiana University offers undergraduate courses and a masters and PhD program in the History and Philosophy of Science.
 Johns Hopkins University has an undergraduate and graduate program in the History of Science, Medicine, and Technology.
University of Kings College has a degree program in History of Science and Technology
 Lehigh University offers an undergraduate level STS concentration (founded in 1972) and a graduate program with emphasis on the History of Industrial America.
 Massachusetts Institute of Technology has a Science, Technology, and Society program which includes HST.
 Michigan State University offers an undergraduate major and minor in History, Philosophy, and Sociology of Science through its Lyman Briggs College.
 New Jersey Institute of Technology has a Science, Technology, and Society program which includes the History of Science and Technology
 Oregon State University offers a Masters and Ph.D. in History of Science through its Department of History.
 Princeton University has a program in the History of Science.
 Rensselaer Polytechnic Institute has a Science and Technology Studies department
 Rutgers has a graduate Program in History of Science, Technology, Environment, and Health.
 Stanford has a History and Philosophy of Science and Technology program.
 Stevens Institute of Technology has an undergraduate and graduate program in the History of Science.
 University of California, Berkeley offers a graduate degree in HST through its History program, and maintains a separate sub-department for the field.
 University of California, Los Angeles has a relatively large group History of Science and Medicine faculty and graduate students within its History department, and also offers an undergraduate minor in the History of Science.
 University of California, Santa Barbara has an interdisciplinary graduate program emphasis in Technology & Society through the Center for Information Technology & Society. The history department is affiliated with the emphasis.
 University of Chicago offers a B.A. program in the History, Philosophy, and Social Studies of Science and Medicine as well as M.A. and Ph.D. degrees through its Committee on the Conceptual and Historical Studies of Science. The graduate program "has a special focus on the history of the human sciences" while also "differ[ing] from other programs in the history and philosophy of science in its emphasis on the importance of training in science."

 University of Florida has a Graduate Program in 'History of Science, Technology, and Medicine' at the University of Florida provides undergraduate and graduate degrees.
 University of Minnesota has a Ph.D. program in History of Science, Technology, and Medicine as well as undergraduate courses in these fields.  The Minnesota model "integrates" historians of science, technology, and medicine within the various science departments they study, each holding a joint appointment.
 University of Oklahoma has an undergraduate minor and a graduate degree program in History of Science.
 University of Pennsylvania has a program in History and Sociology of Science.
 University of Pittsburgh's Department of History and Philosophy of Science offers graduate and undergraduate courses.
 University of Puget Sound has a Science, Technology, and Society program, which includes the history of Science and Technology.
 University of Wisconsin–Madison has one of the largest programs in History of Science, Medicine and Technology, with particular strength in Medical History, History of Biology, History of Science and Religion, and Environmental History.  This program was the first to exist as an independent academic department.  It offers M.A. and Ph.D. degrees as well as an undergraduate major.
Wesleyan University has a Science in Society program.
 Yale University has a program in the History of Science and Medicine.

Prominent historians of the field

Wiebe Bijker
Peter J. Bowler
Janet Browne
Stephen G. Brush
James Burke
Edwin Arthur Burtt (1892–1989)
Johann Beckmann (1739–1811)
Jim Bennett
Herbert Butterfield (1900–1979)
Martin Campbell-Kelly
Georges Canguilhem (1904–1995)
Allan Chapman
I. Bernard Cohen (1914–2003)
A. C. Crombie (1915–1996)
E. J. Dijksterhuis (1892–1965)
Pierre Duhem (1861–1916)
A. Hunter Dupree (1921–2019)
George Dyson
Jacques Ellul (1912–1994)
Eugene S. Ferguson (1916–2004)
Peter Galison
Sigfried Giedion
Charles Coulston Gillispie
Robert Gunther (1869–1940)
Paul Forman
Donna Haraway
Peter Harrison
Ahmad Y Hassan
John L. Heilbron
Boris Hessen
Reijer Hooykaas
David A. Hounshell
Thomas P. Hughes
Evelyn Fox Keller
Daniel Kevles
Alexandre Koyré (1892–1964)
Melvin Kranzberg
Thomas Kuhn
Deepak Kumar
Gilbert LaFreniere
Bruno Latour
David C. Lindberg
G. E. R. Lloyd
Jane Maienschein
Anneliese Maier
Leo Marx
Lewis Mumford (1895–1990)
John E. Murdoch (1927-2010)
Otto Neugebauer (1899–1990)
William R. Newman
David Noble
Ronald Numbers
David E. Nye
Abraham Pais (1918–2000)
Trevor Pinch
Theodore Porter
Lawrence M. Principe
Raúl Rojas
Michael Ruse
A. I. Sabra
Jan Sapp
George Sarton (1884–1956)
Simon Schaffer
Howard Segal (1948–2020)
Steven Shapin
Wolfgang Schivelbusch
Charles Singer (1876–1960)
Merritt Roe Smith
Stephen Snobelen
M. Norton Wise
Frances A. Yates (1899–1981)

Journals and periodicals
Annals of Science
The British Journal for the History of Science
Centaurus
Dynamis
History and Technology (magazine)
History of Science and Technology (journal)
History of Technology (book series)
Historical Studies in the Physical and Biological Sciences (HSPS)
Historical Studies in the Natural Sciences (HSNS)
ICON
IEEE Annals of the History of Computing
Isis
Journal of the History of Biology
Journal of the History of Medicine and Allied Sciences
Notes and Records of the Royal Society
Osiris
Science & Technology Studies
Science in Context
Science, Technology, & Human Values
Social History of Medicine
Social Studies of Science
Technology and Culture
Transactions of the Newcomen Society
Historia Mathematica
Bulletin of the Scientific Instrument Society

See also
 History of science
 History of technology
 Ancient Egyptian technology
 History of science and technology in China
 History of science and technology in Japan
 History of science and technology in France
 History of science and technology in the Indian subcontinent
 Mesopotamian science
 Productivity improving technologies (historical)
 Science and technology in Argentina
 Science and technology in Canada
 Science and technology in Iran
 Science and technology in the United States
 Science in the medieval Islamic world
 Science tourism
 Technological and industrial history of the United States
 Timeline of science and engineering in the Islamic world

Professional societies
 The British Society for the History of Science (BSHS)
 History of Science Society (HSS)
 Newcomen Society 
 Society for the History of Technology (SHOT)
 Society for the Social Studies of Science (4S)
 Scientific Instrument Society

References

Bibliography
Historiography of science
H. Floris Cohen, The Scientific Revolution: A Historiographical Inquiry, University of Chicago Press 1994 - Discussion on the origins of modern science has been going on for more than two hundred years. Cohen provides an excellent overview.
Ernst Mayr, The Growth of Biological Thought, Belknap Press 1985
Michel Serres,(ed.), A History of Scientific Thought, Blackwell Publishers 1995
Companion to Science in the Twentieth Century, John Krige (Editor), Dominique Pestre (Editor), Taylor & Francis 2003, 941pp
The Cambridge History of Science,  Cambridge University Press
Volume 4, Eighteenth-Century Science, 2003
Volume 5, The Modern Physical and Mathematical Sciences, 2002

History of science as a discipline
J. A. Bennett, 'Museums and the Establishment of the History of Science at Oxford and Cambridge', British Journal for the History of Science 30, 1997, 29–46
Dietrich von Engelhardt, Historisches Bewußtsein in der Naturwissenschaft : von der Aufklärung bis zum Positivismus, Freiburg [u.a.] : Alber, 1979
A.-K. Mayer, 'Setting up a Discipline: Conflicting Agendas of the Cambridge History of Science Committee, 1936–1950.' Studies in History and Philosophy of Science, 31, 2000

 

Science and technology
Technological change
Technology
Technology systems